Perdana Park is a recreational park in Tanjung Aru, Kota Kinabalu, Sabah, Malaysia.

Features 
The park features a running track, wheelchair ramps, and reserved parking space for disabled people. At night, visitors can watch light musical fountain, with the park also become a busking venues.

Accessibility 
The access to the park are free from any charges.

See also 
 List of parks and gardens in Malaysia

References 

Kota Kinabalu
Parks in Malaysia